Alseno (  or  ) is a comune (municipality) in the Province of Piacenza in the Italian region Emilia-Romagna, located about  northwest of Bologna and about  southeast of Piacenza. 
 
Alseno borders the following municipalities: Besenzone, Busseto, Castell'Arquato, Fidenza, Fiorenzuola d'Arda, Salsomaggiore Terme, Vernasca.

References

External links
 Official website
Paradoxplace Photos of the Cistercian Abbey of Chiaravalle della Colomba

Cities and towns in Emilia-Romagna
Articles which contain graphical timelines